Oscar William Streit (July 7, 1873 – March 16, 1935) was a Major League Baseball pitcher who played for two seasons. He played for the Boston Beaneaters in 1899 and the Cleveland Bronchos in 1902, pitching in ten career games.

References

External links

1873 births
1935 deaths
Sportspeople from Florence, Alabama
19th-century baseball players
Boston Beaneaters players
Cleveland Bronchos players
Major League Baseball pitchers
Baseball players from Alabama
Columbus Senators players
Wheeling Stogies players
Atlanta Crackers players
Montgomery Black Sox players
Birmingham Barons players
Memphis Egyptians players
Binghamton Bingoes players
New Castle Quakers players